This is a list of the naturally occurring mammal species recorded in Mongolia. There are 121 mammal species in Mongolia, of which two are critically endangered, four are endangered, nine are vulnerable, and six are near threatened.

The following tags are used to highlight each species' conservation status as assessed by the International Union for Conservation of Nature:

Some species were assessed using an earlier set of criteria. Species assessed using this system have the following instead of near threatened and least concern categories:

Order: Artiodactyla (even-toed ungulates) 

The even-toed ungulates are ungulates whose weight is borne about equally by the third and fourth toes, rather than mostly or entirely by the third as in perissodactyls. There are about 220 artiodactyl species, including many that are of great economic importance to humans.
Family: Bovidae (cattle, antelope, sheep, goats)
Subfamily: Antilopinae
Genus: Gazella
Goitered gazelle, G. subgutturosa 
Genus: Procapra
 Mongolian gazelle, P. gutturosa 
Genus: Saiga
Saiga antelope, S. tatarica 
Subfamily: Caprinae
Genus: Capra
Siberian ibex, C. sibrica 
Genus: Ovis
Argali, O. ammon 
Family: Camelidae (camels, llamas)
Genus: Camelus
 Wild Bactrian camel, C. ferus 
Family: Moschidae
Genus: Moschus
 Siberian musk deer, M. moschiferus 
Family: Cervidae (deer)
Subfamily: Cervinae
Genus: Cervus
 Wapiti, C. canadensis 
 Manchurian wapiti, C. c. xanthopygus 
Subfamily: Capreolinae
Genus: Alces
 Moose, A. alces 
Genus: Capreolus
 Siberian roe deer, C. pygargus 
Genus: Rangifer
 Reindeer, R. tarandus 
Family: Suidae
Genus: Sus
Wild boar, S. scrofa

Order: Carnivora (carnivorans) 

There are over 260 species of carnivorans, the majority of which feed primarily on meat. They have a characteristic skull shape and dentition. 
Suborder: Feliformia
Family: Felidae (cats)
Subfamily: Felinae
Genus: Felis
African wildcat, F. lybica 
 Asiatic wildcat, F. l. ornata
Genus: Lynx
Eurasian lynx, L. lynx 
 Turkestan lynx, L. l. isabellinus
Genus: Otocolobus
Pallas's cat, O. manul 
Subfamily: Pantherinae
Genus: Panthera
Snow leopard, P. uncia 
Suborder: Caniformia
Family: Canidae (dogs, foxes)
Genus: Canis
 Gray wolf, C. lupus 
 Mongolian wolf, C. l. chanco
Genus: Nyctereutes
Raccoon dog, N. procyonoides 
Genus: Vulpes
Corsac fox, V. corsac 
Red fox, V. vulpes 
Family: Ursidae (bears)
Genus: Ursus
Brown bear, U. arctos 
 Gobi bear, U. a. gobiensis 
Family: Mustelidae (mustelids)
Genus: Arctonyx
Northern hog badger, A. albogularis 
Genus: Gulo
Wolverine, G. gulo 
Genus: Lutra
Eurasian otter, L. lutra 
Genus: Martes
Beech marten, M. foina 
Sable, M. zibellina 
Genus: Meles
Asian badger, M. leucurus 
Genus: Mustela
Mountain weasel, M. altaica 
Stoat, M. erminea 
Steppe polecat, M. eversmannii 
Least weasel, M. nivalis 
Siberian weasel, M. sibirica 
Genus: Vormela
Marbled polecat, V. peregusna

Order: Chiroptera (bats) 

The bats' most distinguishing feature is that their forelimbs are developed as wings, making them the only mammals capable of flight. Bat species account for about 20% of all mammals.
Family: Vespertilionidae
Subfamily: Myotinae
Genus: Myotis
Lesser mouse-eared bat, M. blythii 
Brandt's bat, M. brandti 
Daubenton's bat, M. daubentonii  
 Ikonnikov's bat, M. ikonnikovi
Whiskered bat, M. mystacinus 
Natterer's bat, M. nattereri 
Subfamily: Vespertilioninae
Genus: Eptesicus
 Botta's serotine, Eptesicus bottae LC
 Gobi big brown bat, Eptesicus gobiensis
 Northern bat, Eptesicus nilssoni
 Serotine bat, Eptesicus serotinus
Genus: Hypsugo
Savi's pipistrelle, H. savii 
Genus: Plecotus
 Brown long-eared bat, Plecotus auritus
 Grey long-eared bat, Plecotus austriacus
Genus: Vespertilio
 Parti-coloured bat, Vespertilio murinus
Subfamily: Murininae
Genus: Murina
 Greater tube-nosed bat, Murina leucogaster

Order: Erinaceomorpha (hedgehogs and gymnures) 

The order Erinaceomorpha contains a single family, Erinaceidae, which comprise the hedgehogs and gymnures. The hedgehogs are easily recognised by their spines, while gymnures (who are not found in Mongolia) look more like large rats.
Family: Erinaceidae (hedgehogs)
Subfamily: Erinaceinae
Genus: Hemiechinus
 Long-eared hedgehog, H. auritus 
Genus: Mesechinus
 Daurian hedgehog, M. dauuricus

Order: Lagomorpha (lagomorphs) 

The lagomorphs comprise two families, Leporidae (hares and rabbits), and Ochotonidae (pikas). Though they can resemble rodents, and were classified as a superfamily in that order until the early twentieth century, they have since been considered a separate order. They differ from rodents in a number of physical characteristics, such as having four incisors in the upper jaw rather than two.
Family: Leporidae (rabbits, hares)
Genus: Lepus
Desert hare, L. tibetanus  
Mountain hare, L. timidus 
Tolai hare, L. tolai 
Family: Ochotonidae (pikas)
Genus: Ochotona
 Alpine pika, Ochotona alpina
 Daurian pika, Ochotona dauurica
 Hoffmann's pika, Ochotona hoffmanni VU
 Northern pika, Ochotona hyperborea
 Pallas's pika, Ochotona pallasi

Order: Perissodactyla (odd-toed ungulates) 

The odd-toed ungulates are browsing and grazing mammals. They are usually large to very large, and have relatively simple stomachs and a large middle toe.

Family: Equidae (horses etc.)
Genus: Equus
 Wild horse, E. ferus  reintroduced
 Przewalski's horse, E. f. przewalskii  reintroduced
Onager, E. hemionus 
Mongolian wild ass, E. h. hemionus

Order: Rodentia (rodents) 

Rodents make up the largest order of mammals, with over 40% of mammalian species. They have two incisors in the upper and lower jaw which grow continually and must be kept short by gnawing.
Suborder: Sciurognathi
Family: Castoridae (beavers)
Genus: Castor
Eurasian beaver, C. fiber 
Family: Sciuridae (squirrels)
Subfamily: Sciurinae
Tribe: Sciurini
Genus: Sciurus
Red squirrel, S. vulgaris 
Tribe: Pteromyini
Genus: Pteromys
 Siberian flying squirrel, Pteromys volans
Subfamily: Xerinae
Tribe: Marmotini
Genus: Marmota
 Gray marmot, Marmota baibacina
 Tarbagan marmot, Marmota sibirica
Genus: Spermophilus
 Alashan ground squirrel, Spermophilus alashanicus
 Daurian ground squirrel, Spermophilus dauricus
 Red-cheeked ground squirrel, Spermophilus erythrogenys
 Long-tailed ground squirrel, Spermophilus undulatus
Genus: Eutamias
 Siberian chipmunk, Eutamias sibiricus
Family: Gliridae (dormice)
Subfamily: Leithiinae
Genus: Dryomys
 Forest dormouse, Dryomys nitedula
Family: Dipodidae (jerboas)
Subfamily: Allactaginae
Genus: Allactaga
 Balikun jerboa, Allactaga balikunica
 Gobi jerboa, Allactaga bullata
 Mongolian five-toed jerboa, Allactaga sibirica
Genus: Pygeretmus
 Dwarf fat-tailed jerboa, Pygeretmus pumilio
Subfamily: Cardiocraniinae
Genus: Cardiocranius
 Five-toed pygmy jerboa, Cardiocranius paradoxus VU
Genus: Salpingotus
 Thick-tailed pygmy jerboa, Salpingotus crassicauda VU
 Kozlov's pygmy jerboa, Salpingotus kozlovi
Subfamily: Dipodinae
Genus: Dipus
 Northern three-toed jerboa, Dipus sagitta
Genus: Stylodipus
 Andrews's three-toed jerboa, Stylodipus andrewsi
 Mongolian three-toed jerboa, Stylodipus sungorus
Subfamily: Euchoreutinae
Genus: Euchoreutes
 Long-eared jerboa, Euchoreutes naso EN
Subfamily: Sicistinae
Genus: Sicista
 Northern birch mouse, Sicista betulina LR/nt
Family: Spalacidae
Subfamily: Myospalacinae
Genus: Myospalax
 Transbaikal zokor, Myospalax psilurus LR/lc
Family: Cricetidae
Subfamily: Cricetinae
Genus: Allocricetulus
 Mongolian hamster, Allocricetulus curtatus LR/lc
Genus: Cricetulus
 Chinese striped hamster, Cricetulus barabensis LR/lc
 Long-tailed dwarf hamster, Cricetulus longicaudatus LR/lc
 Grey dwarf hamster, Cricetulus migratorius LR/nt
 Sokolov's dwarf hamster, Cricetulus sokolovi LR/lc
Genus: Phodopus
 Campbell's dwarf hamster, Phodopus campbelli LR/lc
 Roborovski hamster, Phodopus roborovskii LR/lc
Subfamily: Arvicolinae
Genus: Alticola
 Gobi Altai mountain vole, Alticola barakshin LR/lc
 Large-eared vole, Alticola macrotis LR/lc
 Mongolian silver vole, Alticola semicanus LR/lc
 Flat-headed vole, Alticola strelzowi LR/lc
 Tuva silver vole, Alticola tuvinicus LR/lc
Genus: Arvicola
 Water vole, Arvicola terrestris LR/lc
Genus: Ellobius
 Zaisan mole vole, Ellobius tancrei LR/lc
Genus: Eolagurus
 Yellow steppe lemming, Eolagurus luteus LR/cd
 Przewalski's steppe lemming, Eolagurus przewalskii LR/lc
Genus: Lagurus
 Steppe lemming, Lagurus lagurus LR/lc
Genus: Lasiopodomys
 Brandt's vole, Lasiopodomys brandtii LR/lc
Genus: Microtus
 Field vole, Microtus agrestis LR/lc
 Common vole, Microtus arvalis LR/lc
 Narrow-headed vole, Microtus gregalis LR/lc
 Lacustrine vole, Microtus limnophilus LR/lc
 Maximowicz's vole, Microtus maximowiczii LR/lc
 Mongolian vole, Microtus mongolicus LR/lc
 Tundra vole, Microtus oeconomus LC
Genus: Myodes
 Bank vole, Myodes glareolus LR/lc
 Grey red-backed vole, Myodes rufocanus LR/lc
 Northern red-backed vole, Myodes rutilus LR/lc
Genus: Myopus
 Wood lemming, Myopus schisticolor NT
Genus: Ondatra
 Muskrat, Ondatra zibethicus LR/lc introduced
Family: Muridae (mice, rats, voles, gerbils, hamsters, etc.)
Subfamily: Gerbillinae
Genus: Meriones
 Midday jird, Meriones meridianus LR/lc
 Mongolian gerbil, Meriones unguiculatus LR/lc
Genus: Rhombomys
 Great gerbil, Rhombomys opimus LR/lc
Subfamily: Murinae
Genus: Apodemus
 Korean field mouse, Apodemus peninsulae LR/lc
 Ural field mouse, Apodemus uralensis LR/lc
Genus: Micromys
 Harvest mouse, Micromys minutus LR/nt
Genus: Rattus
Brown rat, R. norvegicus  introduced

Order: Soricomorpha (shrews, moles, and solenodons) 

The "shrew-forms" are insectivorous mammals. The shrews and solenodons closely resemble mice while the moles are stout-bodied burrowers.
Family: Soricidae (shrews)
Subfamily: Crocidurinae
Genus: Crocidura
 Siberian shrew, Crocidura sibirica LR/lc
Lesser white-toothed shrew, C. suaveolens 
Subfamily: Soricinae
Tribe: Nectogalini
Genus: Neomys
 Eurasian water shrew, Neomys fodiens LR/lc
Tribe: Soricini
Genus: Sorex
 Laxmann's shrew, Sorex caecutiens LR/lc
 Siberian large-toothed shrew, Sorex daphaenodon LR/lc
 Eurasian least shrew, Sorex minutissimus LR/lc
 Flat-skulled shrew, Sorex roboratus LR/lc
 Tundra shrew, Sorex tundrensis LR/lc
Family: Talpidae (moles)
Subfamily: Talpinae
Tribe: Talpini
Genus: Talpa
 Altai mole, Talpa altaica LR/lc

Locally extinct 
The following species are locally extinct in the country:
Dhole, Cuon alpinus
Tiger, Panthera tigris

See also
List of chordate orders
Lists of mammals by region
List of prehistoric mammals
Mammal classification
List of mammals described in the 2000s

References

External links

 
Mammals
Mongolia
Mongolia